Dorothea Dirkje Jacoba "Thea" du Pon (later Sjoerdsma, born 27 November 1943) is a retired Dutch diver. She competed at the 1960 Summer Olympics in the 3 m springboard and finished in eighth place. She and her sister Judith were national springboard champions around 1960.

References

1943 births
Living people
Dutch female divers
Olympic divers of the Netherlands
Divers at the 1960 Summer Olympics